FK Spartak Subotica is a professional football club based in Subotica, Vojvodina, Serbia.

Managers

References

External links
 

 
Spartak Subotica